Chiou Lien-hui (15 October 1932 – 13 September 2010) was a Taiwanese politician.

Chiou was first elected mayor of his native Linluo at age 27, and became the youngest mayor in Taiwan at the time. He served until 1965, and three years later was elected to the Pingtung County Council. As a member of the Taiwan Provincial Council from 1973 to 1981, Chiou was named the tangwai candidate for council speaker, but was defeated. He was once chastised by President Chiang Ching-kuo for discussing national affairs while in a provincial council meeting. In 1980, Chiou was the first tangwai candidate to be elected Pingtung County Magistrate. He stepped down in 1985 and served Pingtung County in the Legislative Yuan from 1987 to 1996.

Chiou died of stroke complications at the age of 77 on 13 September 2010. His funeral was held on 23 September.

References

1932 births
2010 deaths
Mayors of places in Taiwan
Pingtung County Members of the Legislative Yuan
Magistrates of Pingtung County
Members of the 1st Legislative Yuan in Taiwan
Members of the 2nd Legislative Yuan
Democratic Progressive Party Members of the Legislative Yuan
Taiwanese politicians of Hakka descent